The 2004–05 Stanford Cardinal men's basketball team represented Stanford University in the 2004–05 NCAA Division I men's basketball season. It was Trent Johnson's first season with the Cardinal after Mike Montgomery left to join the NBA Golden State Warriors. The Cardinal were a member of the Pacific-10 Conference.

Previous season
The Cardinal finished the 2003-04 season 30-2 and ranked as high as #1. In Pac-10 play they finished 17-1, only losing to Washington in the last game of the regular season. The Cardinal won the Pac-10 tournament defeating Washington State, next Oregon, and in the Finals a revenge win over Washington.

After finishing the regular season and Pac-10 Tournament with only one loss, the Cardinal punched their ticket to the NCAA tournament after winning their tournament. In the NCAA Tournament they received a #1 seed in the Phoenix region facing off against the Southland Conference tournament champion UTSA. In the second round they faced the Alabama but lost to them 70-67.

Roster

Schedule and results

|-
!colspan=12 style=| Exhibition

|-
!colspan=12 style=| Non-conference regular season

|-
!colspan=12 style=| Pac-10 Regular season

|-
!colspan=12 style=| Pac-10 tournament

|-
!colspan=12 style=| NCAA tournament

Source:

References

Stanford Cardinal men's basketball seasons
Stanford Cardinal
Stanford Cardinal men's basketball team
Stanford Cardinal men's basketball team
Stanford